A Color Map of the Sun is the fourth studio album by the American electronic music producer Pretty Lights, released on July 2, 2013 by Pretty Lights Music and 8 Minutes 20 Seconds Records. The album is Smith's second double album, as well as his first to be composed entirely from his own original material. Smith's recordings were originally pressed as samples on vinyl and then mixed using software. Purely analog modular synthesis was also used in the making of the album. In describing why he chose this requirement, Smith has stated: "I was trying to think of something that would be a massive challenge for myself and just a really cool project. I wanted to also prove to myself I could do it."

A Color Map of the Sun was the first album that Smith released as a physical product at the same time as the digital copy, and double vinyl and CD copies were also released. The second disc of the CD features an additional 13 live studio recordings of the new music produced for the album. A documentary was filmed during the making of the album and was released the same day as the album.

The album made its debut at #2 on the Billboard Dance/Electronic Charts. On December 6, 2013 A Color Map of the Sun received nomination for Best Dance/Electronica Album in the 2014 Grammys. Pretty Lights made his TV debut on Conan, performing "Around the Block" with Talib Kweli, Break Science, and Eric Krasno of Soulive.

Track listing
A Color Map of the Sun

References

Albums free for download by copyright owner
Pretty Lights albums